The 2016–17 Tulsa Golden Hurricane men's basketball team represented the University of Tulsa during the 2016–17 NCAA Division I men's basketball season. The Golden Hurricane, led by third-year head coach Frank Haith, played their home games at the Reynolds Center in Tulsa, Oklahoma as members of the American Athletic Conference. They finished the season 15–17, 8–10 in AAC play to finish in seventh place. They defeated Tulane in the first round of the AAC tournament to advance to the quarterfinals where they lost to Cincinnati.

Previous season
The Golden Hurricane finished the 2015–16 season 20–12, 12–6 in AAC play to finish in a three-way tie for third place. They lost in the quarterfinals of AAC tournament to Memphis. They received an at-large bid to the NCAA tournament where they lost in the First Four to Michigan.

Departures

Incoming Transfers

Class of 2016 commitments

Roster

Schedule and results

|-
!colspan=9 style=| Exhibition

|-
!colspan=9 style=| Non-conference regular season

|-
!colspan=6 style=| AAC regular season

|-
!colspan=9 style=| AAC tournament

References

Tulsa
Tulsa Golden Hurricane men's basketball seasons
2016 in sports in Oklahoma
2017 in sports in Oklahoma